Malcolm Hooper Kerr (October 8, 1931 – January 18, 1984) was a university professor specializing in the Middle East and the Arab world. An American citizen, he was born and raised in Beirut, Lebanon, where he died. He served as president of the American University of Beirut until he was killed by gunmen in 1984.

Early life and education
Kerr's youth was spent in Lebanon, on and near the campus of the American University of Beirut, where his parents taught for forty years. His parents, Elsa Reckman and Stanley Kerr, were married in Marash, where they met while they were rescuing Armenian women and orphans after the Armenian genocide. After the Marash Affair they moved to Beirut. There his father became the chairman of the Department of Biochemistry at AUB and his mother was Dean of Women.

He entered a masters program in Arabic studies, completing it in 1955 at the American University of Beirut. Here he met his wife, Ann Zwicker Kerr, with whom he had four children. He commenced his doctorate work in Washington, D.C., at the School for Advanced International Studies, Johns Hopkins University, from where he received his Ph.D. in 1958. His dissertation was written under the guidance of Majid Khadduri and Sir Hamilton Gibb.

Professor

In 1964–1965, an academic grant sent him to Cairo, where he worked on his most well-known book, The Arab Cold War, published in 1965. The next year he published Islamic Reform, a reworking of his doctorate dissertation. Following the 1967 Arab-Israeli War, Kerr sensed a drastic change for the worse in the tone of Arab politics, which became harsh and bitter. In 1970–1971, he accepted an academic grant to France and North Africa and worked on a third edition of The Arab Cold War. Kerr served as president of the Middle East Studies Association in 1972. Subsequently, an award of the Middle East Studies Association was named in his honor.

His own scholarship was forthright and honest to the point of sometimes getting him into trouble. While he was often thought of as 'pro-Arab' in writing about the Israeli-Arab conflict, he could be as critical of the Arabs as he was of the Israelis. He spoke the truth as he saw it and was committed to the cause of Arab-Israeli peace and to building understanding between the Arab World and the West."

President of AUB
Although the civil war was still being fiercely battled on occasion, with the recent exit of the Palestinian Liberation Organization, the Lebanese civil struggle for domestic change had been a more focused effort, which encouraged hope for resolution. "Betting on these chances and feeling a sense of calling to the job, the Kerrs decided to go to Beirut." He accepted the position, serving as president for seventeen months. Appointed president in March, effective July 1, the Israeli invasion of Lebanon and occupation of Beirut made him work first from the New York office. He arrived at his College Hall office at the university in September 1982.
On September 16, 1982, Kerr allowed Lebanese residents to use vacant buildings at the American University of Beirut in order to avoid the oncoming Israeli assault on West Beirut. When Israeli officers demanded that Kerr allow them to inspect the university for potential terrorists, Kerr refused. “There are no terrorists on the AUB campus,” he said. “If you're looking for terrorists, look in your own army for those who’ve destroyed Beirut.”

Death
On 18 January 1984, Kerr was shot and killed by two gunmen. He was shot twice in the back of his head, by gunmen using suppressed handguns, in the hallway outside his office. Years later, information regarding Kerr's assassins and their motives still remain uncertain.

News of his sudden death appeared in the media worldwide.

The Kerr family sued the Iranian government under the Antiterrorism and Effective Death Penalty Act of 1996. Iran's government did not contest the suit, which resulted in a monetary judgement in favor of the Kerr family, though Iran never paid.

Personal life
Kerr had four children: Susan, John, Steve, and Andrew. Steve Kerr is a former NBA player, broadcaster, and general manager, as well as the current head coach of the Golden State Warriors.

Selected publications
Malcolm H. Kerr, Lebanon in the Last Years of Feudalism 1840–1868. A contemporary account by Antun Dahir Al-Aqiqi (American University of Beirut 1959)
Malcolm H. Kerr, The Arab Cold War. Gamel Abd al-Nasr and his Rivals, 1958–1970 (Oxford University 1965, 3d ed. 1975)
Malcolm H. Kerr, Islamic Reform. The political and legal theories of Muhammad 'Abduh and Rashid Ridā (Princeton University 1966)
Malcolm H. Kerr, The Elusive Peace in the Middle East (SUNY 1975)
Abraham S. Becker, Bent Hudson, & Malcolm H. Kerr, editors, Economics and Politics of the Middle East (New York: Elsevier 1975)
Malcolm H. Kerr and al-Sayyid Yasin, editors, Rich and Poor States in the Middle East. Egypt and the New Arab Order (Westview 1982)
Samir Seikaly and Ramzi Ba'labakki, editors, Quest for Understanding. Arabic and Islamic studies in honor of Malcolm H. Kerr (American University of Beirut 1991)

See also
American University of Beirut

References

1931 births
1984 deaths
American political scientists
Paul H. Nitze School of Advanced International Studies alumni
People from Beirut
American University of Beirut alumni
Princeton University alumni
University of California, Los Angeles faculty
Deaths by firearm in Lebanon
Deerfield Academy alumni
20th-century political scientists